Jon Davis (born November 8, 1996) is an American basketball player for KK EuroNickel 2005 of the Macedonian First League. He played college basketball for the Charlotte 49ers of Conference USA. He plays the point guard position.

College career
As a sophomore, he was named to the Second Team All-Conference USA. He averaged 19.6 points per game, second best in the conference, and 4.2 assists per game. He shot 48.2 percent on field goals and 38.0 percent for 3-pointers. He had a career-high 38 points in a 91–83 loss to Marshall on January 11, 2018. Davis averaged 17.6 points and 5.5 assists per game as a junior, but Charlotte went 6–23. At the end of the season Davis declared for the 2018 NBA Draft but did not hire an agent to retain his collegiate eligibility.

On February 16, 2019, Davis scored his 2,000th career point in a loss to Old Dominion. He averaged 21.7 points, 4.5 rebounds and 3.7 assists per game as a senior and was named to the second-team All-Conference USA.

Professional career
Davis was signed to an Exhibit 10 deal by the Orlando Magic on October 12, 2019. Davis was assigned to the Magic's G League affiliate, the Lakeland Magic. On January 25, 2020, Davis scored a season-high 30 points in a 130–117 win over the Greensboro Swarm. He averaged 6.4 points, 2.4 rebounds and 1.7 assists per game. On November 2, 2020, Davis signed with Borac Banja Luka of the Championship of Bosnia and Herzegovina. He averaged 10.6 points, 2.7 assists, and 2.3 rebounds per game in the Bosnian league. On September 20, 2021, Davis signed with KK EuroNickel 2005 of the Macedonian First League.

References

External links 
Charlotte 49ers bio
College stats @ Sports-reference.com

1996 births
Living people
American expatriate basketball people in Bosnia and Herzegovina
American men's basketball players
Basketball players from Maryland
Charlotte 49ers men's basketball players
Lakeland Magic players
OKK Borac players
People from Upper Marlboro, Maryland
Point guards